Grantham is an English surname which has been spread to North America and Australasia. Notable people with the surname include:

 Alexander Grantham (1899–1978), British colonial administrator
 Donald Grantham (born 1947), American composer
 Sir Guy Grantham (1900–92), British Admiral, Commander-in-Chief at Portsmouth
 Jeremy Grantham, Chairman of the Board of Grantham Mayo Van Otterloo, a Boston-based asset management firm
 Joseph Grantham (died 1830), first police officer to be killed on duty in the United Kingdom
 Leslie Grantham, British TV actor
 Roy Grantham (1926–2013), British trade union leader
 Sir Thomas Grantham, commander of the naval fleet of the British East India Company
 William Grantham (1835–1911), English judge and Conservative M.P. for East Surrey and Croydon

External links
 Grantham Surname DNA Project

English toponymic surnames